Gary Gerould, nicknamed “The G-Man”, is an American sportscaster, best known as the radio voice of the NBA's Sacramento Kings since 1985. The Sacramento Kings renewed his radio broadcaster contract for 4 years on September 15, 2017. 

He is also a motorsports reporter for ABC and ESPN and served as a pit lane reporter for the 1981 and 1982 Caesars Palace Grand Prix for NBC.

Gerould was born in Midland, Michigan and got his start in broadcasting at the age of 15 on a local telegraph station.  He later attended Anderson University in Indiana and upon graduation went to Chico, California work for KHSL Radio, later moving to KCRA-AM and KCRA TV, as a sports reporter before finally coming to NBC and ESPN, specializing in coverage of the motorsports.  He also called play-by-play for NBC's NFL coverage in the early 1980s, and had the opportunity to cover the 1988 Summer Olympics for the network.

In 1985 as the Kansas City Kings moved to Sacramento, Gerould was tabbed as their radio play-by-play announcer. During the 2010–11 season, Gerould completed his 2,000 Kings broadcast, ranking fifth among active NBA announcers.

In the 1980s and 1990s, he also worked for the motorsports program American Sports Cavalcade.

Gerould continues to serve as the Kings' radio play-by-play voice, and worked with ESPN and ABC Sports serving as a pit reporter for Indy Racing League and CART/Champ Car (now defunct) races, including the Indianapolis 500. He covered the NHRA series for ESPN.

He made a comeback into pit reporting for ABC's coverage of the IndyCar race at the New Hampshire International Speedway in August 2011.

In October 2015, Gerould announced his retirement from television sportscasting; However, it was announced on June 25, 2020 that Gerould would briefly return as the TV play-by-play announcer for the Kings during the resumption of the suspended NBA season following the resignation of Grant Napear.

Gerould runs his own public relations outfit. His son Bob is also a sports broadcaster.

References

Year of birth missing (living people)
Living people
American radio sports announcers
American television sports announcers
Anderson University (Indiana) alumni
Olympic Games broadcasters
College football announcers
Motorsport announcers
National Football League announcers
Oakland Raiders announcers
Sportspeople from Midland, Michigan
Sacramento Kings announcers
Television anchors from Sacramento, California